Grand-Poitiers is the communauté urbaine, an intercommunal structure, centred on the city of Poitiers. It is located in the Vienne department, in the Nouvelle-Aquitaine region, western France. It was created on 1 January 2017 as a communauté d'agglomération and transformed into a communauté urbaine on 1 July 2017. Its area is 1064.7 km2. Its population was 194,068 in 2014, of which 88,665 in Poitiers proper.

Composition
The communauté urbaine consists of the following 40 communes:

Beaumont Saint-Cyr
Béruges
Biard
Bignoux
Bonnes
Buxerolles
Celle-Lévescault
La Chapelle-Moulière
Chasseneuil-du-Poitou
Chauvigny
Cloué
Coulombiers
Croutelle
Curzay-sur-Vonne
Dissay
Fontaine-le-Comte
Jardres
Jaunay-Marigny
Jazeneuil
Lavoux
Ligugé
Liniers
Lusignan
Mignaloux-Beauvoir
Migné-Auxances
Montamisé
Poitiers
Pouillé
La Puye
Rouillé
Saint-Benoît
Sainte-Radégonde
Saint-Georges-lès-Baillargeaux
Saint-Julien-l'Ars
Saint-Sauvant
Sanxay
Savigny-Lévescault
Sèvres-Anxaumont
Tercé
Vouneuil-sous-Biard

References

Poitiers
Poitiers